The Muskingum Watershed Conservancy District (MWCD) is a political subdivision of the State of Ohio organized in 1933 to develop and implement a plan for flood reduction and water conservation in the Muskingum River watershed, the state's largest wholly contained watershed, covering more than . Since the original construction of fourteen reservoirs and dams in the 1930s (two more were built later), more than $7 billion worth of property damage has been saved from flooding.

Projects
After its formation, the MWCD began planning an extensive system of flood-reduction reservoirs and dams in the Muskingum River watershed, which covers all or portion of 27 counties (about 20 percent of the state). By 1938, a network of fourteen reservoirs and dams was constructed. The ten permanent reservoirs are widely recognized for their outdoor recreational opportunities, attracting more than five  million visitors annually.

Atwood Lake
Beach City Lake
Bolivar Dam
Charles Mill Lake
Clendening Lake

Dover Dam
Leesville Lake
Mohawk Dam
Mohicanville Dam
Piedmont Lake

Pleasant Hill Lake
Seneca Lake
Tappan Lake
Wills Creek Lake

Two additional dams and lakes were added at a later date: Dillon Lake (1960) and North Branch Kokosing.

The operation of the lakes and dams, along with the property immediately surrounding the dam sites, was transferred to the U.S. Army Corps of Engineers, Huntington District, after the approval of the Flood Control Act of 1939 by Congress. The MWCD continues to be responsible for the management of much of the reservoir areas behind the dams, serving as a partner to the U.S. Army Corps of Engineers for flood reduction. In addition to operating a number of recreation facilities, the MWCD cooperates with the Ohio Division of Wildlife for fishing and hunting management.

References

External links

U.S. Army Corps of Engineers, Huntington District

 
Government of Ohio
Muskingum River